The Silver Streak Zephyr was a train service of the Chicago, Burlington and Quincy Railroad in the American midwest.  It ran from 1940 through 1959.

On April 15, 1940 the Chicago, Burlington and Quincy Railroad inaugurated the Silver Streak Zephyr operating a Lincoln-Omaha-St. Joseph-Kansas City round trip daily. The new train was named Silver Streak Zephyr for the train portrayed in the Paramount Motion Picture The Silver Streak, with the starring role by the Pioneer Zephyr. The CB&Q liked the name and assigned it to the new Zephyr. This was the second Zephyr assigned to this route as the Pioneer Zephyr had operated in this service for some time and had actually outgrown it, when it generated more traffic than it was able to handle.

For power the new five car lightweight streamliner was assigned a new EMD E5A unit developing  Passengers were obviously pleased with the new Silver Streak Zephyr as ridership showed a marked increase within days of the new trains entry into service. As with the earlier General Pershing Zephyr and Ak-Sar-Ben Zephyr the new Silver Streak Zephyr no longer operated with articulated train sets or for that matter even articulated cars. The Burlington's days of ordering articulated equipment were over and no further cars of that type would ever be contemplated.

References

Named passenger trains of the United States
Passenger trains of the Chicago, Burlington and Quincy Railroad
North American streamliner trains
Railway services introduced in 1940
Railway services discontinued in 1959